Mediawan is a French media conglomerate. It was founded in December 2015 by Xavier Niel (founder of Free), Matthieu Pigasse (general director of the bank Lazard and, with Xavier Niel, a major stock holder in Le Monde and L'Obs) and Pierre-Antoine Capton (founder of the French media production company Troisième Œil Productions) under the legal form of a special-purpose acquisition company ("SPAC") to acquire assets and operations in the media production and distribution business in Europe with the ambition to become "one of the largest platforms for European content".

The company went public on April 22, 2016, raising €250 million ($310 million).

In July 2016, Mediawan acquired CC&C, a film production company specializing in documentaries.

In January 2017, Mediawan acquired AB Groupe for €270 million. Before that AB Groupe was owned by Claude Berda (53%) and TF1 Group (33.5%).

In December 2017, it was reported that Mediawan was in talks for acquiring a stake of up to 55% in Aton Soumache and Dimitri Rassam’s animation studio ON Kids & Family (including Method Animation) for about €50 million.

In January 2018, Mediawan acquired the French television division of Luc Besson's EuropaCorp and renamed into Storia Television.

On 6 June 2018, Mediawan announced that its acquisition of a 53.53% stake in ON Entertainment was finalized

On 11 October 2018, Mediawan rebranded AB Groupe as Mediawan Thematics.

On 22 June 2020, Mediawan announced their intent to buy Lagardère Studios from the Lagardère Group for €100,000,000. The sale was completed on November 2 of that same year.

On 30 October 2022, it was reported that Mediawan was in talks to acquiring in a significant stake Brad Pitt's studio Plan B Entertainment.

References

External links 

 

Mass media companies of France
Companies based in Paris
2015 establishments in France
Mass media in Paris